Here is the complete list of fixtures and results of test match rugby in 2009. All major international competitions, such as the Tri Nations and the Six Nations Championship, continue, as does the qualification process for the 2011 Rugby World Cup.

International competitions

Worldwide
 2008-09 IRB Sevens World Series — Winners: 
 2009 Rugby World Cup Sevens — Winners:  (men),  Australia (women)
 2009 IRB Junior World Championship — Winners: 
 2009 IRB Junior World Rugby Trophy — Winner: 
 Nations Cup — Winners:

Africa
2009 Tri Nations Series — Winners: 
2009 Africa Cup
2009 Castel Beer Trophy
2011 Rugby World Cup - Africa qualification

Asia
2009 Asian Five Nations – Winner: 
2009 Asian Five Nations - Division One – Winner: Arabian Gulf
2009 Asian Five Nations - Division Two – Winner: 
2009 Asian Five Nations - Division Three – Winner: 
2009 Asian Five Nations - Regional Divisions
 Division 1: 
 Division 2: 
2011 Rugby World Cup - Asia qualification

Europe
2009 Six Nations Championship — Winner: 
2008-2010 European Nations Cup First Division- Winner: 
2008-2010 European Nations Cup Division 2A - Winner: 
2008-2010 European Nations Cup Division 2B - Winner: 
2008-2010 European Nations Cup Division 3A - Winner: 
2008-2010 European Nations Cup Division 3B - Winner: 
2008-2010 European Nations Cup Division 3C - Winner: 
2008-2010 European Nations Cup Division 3D -Winner:  
2011 Rugby World Cup - Europe qualification

North America
2009 Churchill Cup - Ireland A
2011 Rugby World Cup - Americas qualification

Oceania
2009 Tri Nations Series — Winners: 
2009 Pacific Nations Cup – 
2011 Rugby World Cup - Oceania qualification

South America
2009 South American Rugby Championship "A"
2009 South American Rugby Championship "B"
2011 Rugby World Cup - Americas qualification

Major club competitions

Europe
 Heineken Cup – Leinster (Ireland)
 European Challenge Cup – Northampton Saints 
  Guinness Premiership – Leicester Tigers
 National Division One – Leeds Carnegie, relegated from the Premiership the previous season, win the title and an immediate return to the Premiership. Leeds' place in what will become the RFU Championship in 2009–10 will be taken by Bristol, bottom finishers in the Premiership.
  Top 14 – Perpignan
 Rugby Pro D2 – Racing Métro win the championship and automatic promotion to the Top 14. Albi win the playoffs to determine the second promotion place. Their places in Pro D2 will be taken by the bottom two teams from Top 14, Dax and Mont-de-Marsan.
 (Ireland) Celtic League – Munster (Ireland)
  Super 10 – Benetton Treviso

Southern Hemisphere
 Super 14 – Bulls

Australia
 Shute Shield - Sydney University

New Zealand
 Air New Zealand Cup – Canterbury
 Heartland Championship – Lochore Cup - North Otago; Meads Cup - Whanganui
 Ranfurly Shield - Southland

South Africa
 Currie Cup – Blue Bulls

International results
 Complete list of fixtures involving national teams during 2009.
 • - International Friendly (a fixture not affiliated to any international tournament.)
 ♦ - World Cup Qualifying matches.

January

February

March

April

May

June

July

August

September

Other Test Match results

References
Six Nations
Rugby World Cup

See also
Rugby union in 2008
2009 in sports
2011 Rugby World Cup

 
Years of the 21st century in rugby union